Events from the year 1594 in the Kingdom of Scotland.

Incumbents
Monarch – James VI

Events
Declinature Act
Ejection Caution Act
Land Purchase Act
Parricide Act
 3 October – Battle of Glenlivet: Catholic clansmen of George Gordon, 1st Marquess of Huntly and Francis Hay, 9th Earl of Erroll, are victorious over the Protestant forces of Archibald Campbell, 7th Earl of Argyll

Births
 19 February – Henry Frederick, Prince of Wales (died 1612 in England)
Lady Anne Campbell
Robert Douglas, minister (died 1674)
William Mure, writer and politician (died 1657)

Deaths
John Seton, Lord Barns, diplomat, courtier and judge

See also
 Timeline of Scottish history

References